Rajani Kanta Patir (born 1917, date of death unknown), also known as R. K. Patir, was an Indian Administrative Service officer. He was the chief secretary of the Indian state of Arunachal Pradesh, retiring from that position in 1982.

His autobiography, Dawn in the East: An Autobiography, was published in 1999 and tells his story of being born in a Mising family and becoming successful. In March 2017, it was noted that Patir is deceased.

Works

References

1917 births
Year of death missing
Arunachal Pradesh politicians
Indian civil servants
People from Itanagar